Fahbunmee BirdRangsit (ฟ้าบุญมี เบิร์ดรังสิต) is a retired Thai Muay Thai fighter. He fought out of Sor.Jor.Lekmuangnon Gym in Lahan, Nonthaburi. Early in his career, he was a student of Sangtiennoi Sor.Rungroj at Tor.Sangtiennoi Gym. In 2017, at 18 years old, Fahbunmee won the 105 lb Rajadamnern Stadium title which he vacated in order to move up in weight class.

Titles and accomplishments 

 2017 Rajadamnern Stadium 105 lbs Champion
2020 Rajadamnern Stadium 115 lbs Champion

Fight record 

|- style="background:#fbb;"
|2021-02-28
|Loss
| align="left" | Saifahnoi MuadvitisChiangMai
|WSS Fights, World Siam Stadium
|Bangkok, Thailand
|Decision
|5
|3:00
|-
|- style="background:#cfc;"
|2020-11-04
|Win
| align="left" | Saifahnoi MuadvitisChiangMai
|Rajadamnern Stadium
|Bangkok, Thailand
|Decision
|5
|3:00
|-
! colspan="8" style="background:white" |Wins the vacant 115 lb Rajadamnern Stadium title
|- style="background:#cfc;"
|2020-10-10
|Win
| align="left" | Petchmuangnon Jitmuangnon
|Thanakorn Stadium
|Thailand
|KO
|3
|
|- style="text-align:center; background:#FFBBBB;"
|2020-09-09
|Loss
| align="left" | Saifahnoi MuadvitisChiangMai
|Thanakorn Stadium
|Thailand
|Decision
|5
|3:00
|- style="background:#c5d2ea;"
|2020-02-24
|Draw
| align="left" | Petchmuangnon Jitmuangnon
|Rajadamnern Stadium
|Bangkok, Thailand
|Decision
|5
|3:00
|- style="background:#cfc;"
|2020-01-21
|Win
| align="left" | Yodpanum Por.Phetkaikaew
|Lumpinee Stadium
|Bangkok, Thailand
|Decision
|5
|3:00
|- style="background:#cfc;"
|2019-12-29
|Win
| align="left" | Pichitchai Sor.Jor.Vichitmuangpadriew
|Rajadamnern Stadium
|Bangkok, Thailand
|Decision
|5
|3:00
|- style="background:#cfc;"
|2019-11-30
|Win
| align="left" | Wirachat Boonrasri
|Rajadamnern Stadium
|Bangkok, Thailand
|Decision
|5
|3:00
|- style="background:#cfc;"
|2019-09-30
|Win
| align="left" | Yodphet Annymuaythai
|Rajadamnern Stadium
|Bangkok, Thailand
|Decision
|5
|3:00
|- style="background:#FFBBBB;"
|2019-07-08
|Loss
| align="left" | Pichitchai Sor.Jor.Vichitmuangpadriew
|Rajadamnern Stadium
|Bangkok, Thailand
|Decision
|5
|3:00
|- style="background:#FFBBBB;"
|2019-06-08
|Loss
| align="left" | Namsurin Chor.Ketwina
|Siam Omnoi Stadium
|Bangkok, Thailand
|Decision
|5
|3:00
|- style="background:#FFBBBB;"
|2019-03-08
|Loss
| align="left" | Dejrit Por.Telakul
|Rajadamnern Stadium
|Bangkok, Thailand
|Decision
|5
|3:00
|- style="background:#cfc;"
|2019-01-24
|Win
| align="left" | Phichitchai Por.Chalad
|Rajadamnern Stadium
|Bangkok, Thailand
|KO
|4
|
|- style="text-align:center; background:#FFBBBB;"
|2018-12-14
|Loss
| align="left" | Dejrit Por.Telakul
|Lumpinee Stadium
|Bangkok, Thailand
|Decision
|5
|3:00
|- style="background:#c5d2ea;"
|2018-09-21
|Draw
| align="left" | Wanmawin Aor.Meekun
|Rajadamnern Stadium
|Bangkok, Thailand
|Decision
|5
|3:00
|- style="background:#FFBBBB;"
|2018-05-19
|Loss
| align="left" | Mohawk Teeded99
|Siam Omnoi Stadium
|Bangkok, Thailand
|Decision
|5
|3:00
|- style="background:#cfc;"
|2018-04-10
|Win
| align="left" | Phetpanlan Petchsimuen
|Lumpinee Stadium
|Bangkok, Thailand
|KO
|3
|
|- style="text-align:center; background:#FFBBBB;"
|2017-11-02
|Loss
| align="left" | Sayanlek Sayangym
|Rajadamnern Stadium
|Bangkok, Thailand
|Decision
|5
|3:00
|- style="background:#cfc;"
|2017-09-15
|Win
| align="left" | Anuwat Natkinpa
|Rajadamnern Stadium
|Bangkok, Thailand
|Decision
|5
|3:00
|- style="background:#cfc;"
|2017-06-15
|Win
| align="left" | Kumantong Chor.Hapayak
|Rajadamnern Stadium
|Bangkok, Thailand
|Decision
|5
|3:00
|-
! colspan="8" style="background:white" |Wins the 105 lb Rajadamnern Stadium title
|- style="background:#cfc;"
|2017-05-09
|Win
| align="left" | Ninmongkon Aor.Sabuytae
|Lumpinee Stadium
|Bangkok, Thailand
|Decision
|5
|3:00
|- style="background:#cfc;"
|2017-04-13
|Win
| align="left" | Rungwittaya Singnawawut
|Rajadamnern Stadium
|Bangkok, Thailand
|Decision
|5
|3:00
|- style="background:#FFBBBB;"
|2017-03-01
|Loss
| align="left" | Konkhon Kiatphontip
|Rajadamnern Stadium
|Bangkok, Thailand
|Decision
|5
|3:00
|- style="background:#cfc;"
|2017-01-30
|Win
| align="left" | Phetpanlan Big-M-Gym
|Rajadamnern Stadium
|Bangkok, Thailand
|Decision
|5
|3:00
|- style="background:#FFBBBB;"
|2016-12-06
|Loss
| align="left" | Hongtae Rinmuaythai
|Lumpinee Stadium
|Bangkok, Thailand
|Decision
|5
|3:00
|- style="background:#FFBBBB;"
|2016-09-10
|Loss
| align="left" | Kaodengsuji Banmikiew
|Montree Studio Boxing Stadium
|Bangkok, Thailand
|KO
|2
|
|- style="text-align:center; background:#FFBBBB;"
|2015-12-30
|Loss
| align="left" | Bangklanoi Sakchaichot
|Rajadamnern Stadium
|Bangkok, Thailand
|Decision
|5
|3:00
|- style="background:#FFBBBB;"
|2015-12-02
|Loss
| align="left" | Bangklanoi Sakchaichot
|Rajadamnern Stadium
|Bangkok, Thailand
|Decision
|5
|3:00
|- style="background:#cfc;"
|2015-10-28
|Win
| align="left" | Bangklanoi Sakchaichot
|Lumpinee Stadium
|Bangkok, Thailand
|Decision
|5
|3:00
|- style="background:#cfc;"
|2015-09-26
|Win
| align="left" | Kaodeng Sujibamikiew
|Montree Studio
|Bangkok, Thailand
|Decision
|5
|3:00
|- style="background:#cfc;"
|2015-08-26
|Win
| align="left" | Suwanabhum STD.Transport
|Rajadamnern Stadium
|Bangkok, Thailand
|KO
|1
|
|- style="text-align:center; background:#cfc;"
|2015-07-29
|Win
| align="left" | Salatan Sor.Jor.Vichitpradriew
|Rajadamnern Stadium
|Bangkok, Thailand
|KO
|3
|
|- style="text-align:center; background:#cfc;"
|2015-04-24
|Win
| align="left" | Pananchoenglek Sitkrupak
|Lumpinee Stadium
|Bangkok, Thailand
|KO
|4
|
|-
|-
| colspan=9 |Legend:

References 

1993 births
Fahbunmee BirdRangsit
Living people
Fahbunmee BirdRangsit